Buttock cleavage is minor exposure of the buttocks and the intergluteal cleft between them, often because of low-rise pants. The crena is a formal term for the cleft between the buttocks.

History
When faced with indecency issues back in the 1930s, W. G. Cassidy explained in an essay titled "Private Parts: A Judicial View" that exposure of a buttock cleavage may come under "other private parts" in Australian law, though indecency generally involves exposure of the genital area.

In the early 2000s, it became fashionable for young women and men to expose their buttocks this way, often in tandem with low rise jeans. The Cincinnati Enquirer called it the "new cleavage", and expressed views that "It's virtually impossible to find jeans to cover your hipbone". In August 2001, The Sun celebrated a "bum cleavage week" claiming that "bums are the new tits". In reaction to this trend, Saturday Night Live aired a parody advertisement in their April 16, 2006 episode for a product called Neutrogena Coin Slot Cream, in which host Lindsay Lohan appeared.

British designer Alexander McQueen was particularly mentioned as the originator of buttock cleavage-revealing jeans, known as the "bumster", in cultural critique Sheila Jeffreys' Beauty and Misogyny: Harmful Cultural Practices in the West. United States Patent 6473908 from 2002 registers a design for trousers with a removable buttock cleavage-revealing portion. In the mid-2000s, Good Morning America reported on a rise of popularity of the buttock cleavage among celebrities. In a 2002 interview with Ultimate-Guitar.com, pop singer Avril Lavigne was quoted as saying: "My buttcrack showing is like my trademark.".

In 2010s, media reported rise in popularity among females of ultra-short miniskirts and shorts, which publicly exposed "underbuns" (i.e. lower part of buttocks – also referred as underbutts or "reverse buttock cleavage"), due to endorsement by celebrities such as Lady Gaga.

Lexicon
The terms plumber butt or plumber's crack (Canadian, Australian, and American English) and builder's bum (British English) refer to the exposure of male buttock cleavage, especially on occasions of careless bending over. The expression "builder's bum" was first recorded in 1988. The terms are based on the popular impression that work in these professions frequently involves bending over in locations where bystanders are observing from the rear.

In the Netherlands the term  and in Germany  and in Poland  is used, which can be translated as "builder's/mason's/plumber's cleavage".

See also
 Camel toe
 Breast cleavage
 Wardrobe malfunction
 Whale tail

References

External links 
 

2000s fashion
Cleavage
Human appearance